Arnfinn Haga (born 10 February 1936) is a Norwegian teacher and non-fiction writer, born at Stord. He made his literary début in 1974 with Det regner i fjellet. His authorship has focused on Norwegian resistance during the occupation of Norway by Nazi Germany from 1940 to 1945. He was awarded the King's Medal of Merit in gold in 2003 for his literary works.

Selected works

References

1936 births
Living people
People from Hordaland
Norwegian non-fiction writers
Norwegian military writers
Recipients of the King's Medal of Merit in gold